Colin Alwin Harris (born 6 June 1974), professionally known by his stage name Colle´  Kharis (pronounced Collay Karis), is a Guyanese-American reggae and dancehall recording artist hailing from the small country of Guyana, South America.
He is best known for his 2022 single "Johnny Don't Cry".

Biography

Background
Colle´ Kharis was born in Kitty, a district of Georgetown, in Guyana's Demerara-Mahaica Region. He grew up in nearby Bachelor's Adventure, a semi-rural village on the east coast of Guyana, until relocating to the United States. His stage name, Colle´  Kharis, is a byproduct of his birth name, Colin Harris. Colle´ was the fifth of six children. His father, a veteran of the Guyana Defense Force, died when Colle´was thirteen years old. His mother worked as a sales manager at a community shopping plaza in Guyana. In 1990, he immigrated to Brooklyn, New York, with his family. After graduating from high school, he joined the United States military.

Education
In 2022, he was awarded a Doctor of Education with a specialization in Instructional and Performance Technology from The University of West Florida.

Career
Colle´ Kharis' got his passion for music from his father. As a young boy, Colle´ watch his father routinely playing his collection of vinyl records – consistently flipping the record to the opposite side to listen to the other songs. His interest grew for deejaying after routinely watching his favorite reggae artists performing on Reggae Sunsplash and Sting reggae music festivals on VHS. At Age 14, Colle´ started writing lyrics to the instrumentals (riddim) side of his father's size 45 vinyl records. Shortly after, Colle´ picked up the microphone and began toasting under the moniker of Scorpion.

Colle´ Kharis enlisted in the United States Air Force in 1999 and obtained the AFSC of 2E0X1 (Ground Radar Systems). He served with 96th Communications Squadron during the War in Afghanistan and Second Persian Gulf War. The highest rank he achieved was Staff sergeant before receiving an honorable discharge in 2005.

Colle´ Kharis began recording his full-length debut album, Defined Versatility, which he co-produced. He completed and released Defined Versatility, while serving in the United States Air Force in the Florida Panhandle. It was first released in 2005 by the independent label, Rac Jam Records, and then rereleased through DistroKid in May 2019. Colle´ perfected his craft as a performer by sharing the stage as the opening act for Jamaican reggae artist Wayne Wonder and popular Hip-hop artists such as Slick Rick, Mr. Cheeks, Ying Yang Twins, Pastor Troy, Chamillionaire, Lil’ Flip, Roy Jones Jr., and more. In 2022, Colle´ recorded "Johnny Don't Cry", a track inspired, in part, by the public trial of Johnny Depp and Amber Heard, and Tomorrow's Freedom, a revolutionary song tackling the injustices against the poor and minorities.

Discography

Albums

Notes

References

External links
 

1974 births
Living people
20th-century Guyanese male singers
Guyanese emigrants to the United States
American male singer-songwriters
Guyanese reggae singers
21st-century Guyanese male singers
American pop singers
Afro-Guyanese people
People from Georgetown, Guyana